The Fort Pitt Hornets (sometimes incorrectly referred to as the Fort Pitt Panthers) were a semi-professional ice hockey team based in Pittsburgh, Pennsylvania. The team played in the United States Amateur Hockey Association (USAHA), which was technically a semi-pro league by 1924.

History
The Hornets were a spin-off of another USAHA club from Pittsburgh, the Yellow Jackets, and played in the league's Eastern Division. During the 1924–25 season, the Hornets finished their season with a 17–7–0 record for first place in the Eastern Division. However, the club was defeated in the USAHA championship series by their intra-city rivals, the Yellow Jackets, three games to none with one tie. Former Yellow Jackets player-coach Dinny Manners served as a player-coach for the Hornets.

Rough-play allegations
The USAHA teams were known, at this time, for known for their rough play. During the Hornets' first round of the 1924–25 playoffs, which was against the Boston Athletic Association, Pittsburgh player, Joe Sills reportedly butt-ended Leo Hughes in the face, requiring the removal of one Hughes' eyes, and nearly the other. The Boston AA’s player was a fan favourite and the team's supporters protested the hit. Boston then threatened to quit the league because of the "Unnecessary and willful roughing." However, Pittsburgh's manager, H.N. Forner, contended that injuries that were inflicted to his players, such as the case with the Hornets' Lorne Armstrong, could have been just as serious. During the series, Armstrong was cut in the back of the neck by the skate of a Boston player. The following night, Armstrong received a cut between his eyes which could have taken one of his eyes, if the cut was an inch away in either direction. As for Joe Sills, he was reportedly kneed by a Boston player and unable to play for an entire week. After Leo Hughes had lost his eye against the Hornets, the USAHA's president stated that "Hockey, you know, is not a parlour game."

Prominent players
The Hornets featured several future-NHL players such as:

Joe Miller
Bernie Brophy
Hector Lépine
Charles Larose
Johnny McKinnon

Notes

Ice hockey teams in Pittsburgh
1924 establishments in Pennsylvania
Defunct ice hockey teams in Pennsylvania
Defunct Pittsburgh sports teams
Fort Pitt
United States Amateur Hockey Association teams
1925 disestablishments in Pennsylvania
Ice hockey clubs established in 1924
Ice hockey clubs disestablished in 1925